A chain is a series of connected links which are typically made of metal.

Chain may also refer to:

Accessories and apparel
 Chain mail, a type of armor made of interlocking chain links
 Neck chain (or necklace), a type of jewelry which is worn around the neck

Places
 Chain Bridge (Budapest), a suspension bridge that spans River Danube between Buda and Pest
 Chain Bridge (Potomac River), a bridge across the Potomac River at Little Falls in Washington, D.C.
 Chains (geological site), a geological site on the north-west plateau of Exmoor, Somerset, England
 Union Chain Bridge, a bridge between Northumberland, England and Berwickshire, Scotland

People with the name
 Ernst Chain (1906–1979), Nobel Prize-winning chemist famed for his isolation of penicillin
 John T. Chain Jr. (1934–2021), retired U.S. Air Force general

Arts, entertainment, and media

Films and television
 Chain (film), a 2004 film written and directed by Jem Cohen
 Chains (film), a 1949 Italian melodrama film
 Chains, a short film starring TNA wrestler Kurt Angle
 Chains (Blackadder), a 1986 episode of the British sitcom Blackadder II
 Chains of Love (TV series), an American dating game show adapted from a Dutch television series

Literature
 Chain (play), a 1992 play by Pearl Cleage
 Chains (novel), a 2008 historical-fiction novel by Laurie Halse Anderson
 Chains (play), a 1909 play by Elizabeth Baker

Music
 Chain (band), an Australian blues rock band active from the 1960s to the present

Albums
 Chain (Bonnie Pink EP), 2008
Chain (NCT 127 EP), 2018
 Chain (KAT-TUN album), 2012
 Chain (Paul Haig album), 1989
 Chain (Pylon album), 1990
 Chains (album), by Yōko Oginome, 1997

Songs
 "Chains" (DLT song), 1996
 "Chains" (Nick Jonas song), 2014
 "Chains" (Patty Loveless song), 1990
 "Chains" (Cookies song), 1962, covered by The Beatles
 "Chains" (Tina Arena song), 1994
 "Chains" (Usher song), 2015
 "The Chain" (Fleetwood Mac song), 1977
 "Chains", a song by Chicago from the 1982 album Chicago 16
 "Chain", a song by the Fire Theft from their 2003 self-titled album

Business and economics
 Chain (real estate), a group of buyers/sellers that are linked together
 Chain of command, the line of authority and responsibility along which orders are passed
 Chain store, a retail shop outlets which share a brand and central management
 Chained dollars, used to express real dollar amounts adjusted over time for inflation
 Cinema chain, or movie chain
 Cold chain, a temperature-controlled supply chain
 Fast food chain
 Hotel chain
 Restaurant chain
 Supply chain, a coordinated system of organizations, people, activities, information and resources involved in moving a product or service from supplier to customer
 Value chain, a management concept first described by Michael Porter

Mathematics
 Chain (ordered set), a totally ordered set, usually a subset of a given partially ordered set
 Chain (algebraic topology), a formal linear combination of k-simplices
 Chain complex, a generalization of the algebraic topology construct to homological algebra
 Chain rule, a tool for differentiation in calculus
 Chain sequence, numbers in the mathematical study of continued fractions
 Conway chained arrow notation, a way of expressing exponents using arrows
 Jordan chain, a sequence of linearly independent generalized eigenvectors of descending rank
 Markov chain, a discrete-time stochastic process with the Markov property
 Pseudo-arc, which has at its heart the concept of a chain

Mechanics, engineering, and implements
 Bar-link chain (or block chain), a mechanical drive chain
 Bicycle chain, a roller chain that transfers power from the pedals to the drive-wheel of a bicycle
 Buffers and chain coupler, a railway device 
 Catenary (or chain), the shape of a hanging flexible cable when supported at its ends and acted upon by a uniform gravitational force
 Chain Home and Chain Home Low, early British RDF (radar) systems of the WWII era
 Chain tool, a small mechanical device used to "break" a bicycle chain in such a way that it could be mended with the same tool
 Conveyor chain, a chain that conveys items in chain conveyor systems
 Drive chain, a way of transmitting mechanical power from one place to another
 Print chain on a chain printer
 Roller chain, most commonly used for transmission of mechanical power
 Self-lubricating chain, to eliminate the need for further lubrication
 Snow chains or tire chains, devices fitted to the tires of vehicles to provide maximum traction
 Timing chain, part of an internal combustion engine

Science

Chemistry
 Chain reaction, a sequence of reactions where a reactive product or by-product causes additional reactions
 Ideal chain, a mathematical model of polymer folding
 Polymer chain, structure of a polymer
 Worm-like chain, a model in polymer physics used to describe the behavior of semi-flexible polymers

Other uses in science
 Electron transport chain, a sequence of chemical reactions yielding the transport of an electron through a membrane
 Food chain, a hierarchical or recursive list of predators and prey

Sequences

Geological features
 Archipelago, a chain of islands
 Crater chain, a line of craters on the surface of an astronomical body
 Mountain range, a chain of hills or mountains

Other sequences
 Chain bridge, type of suspension bridge
 Chain, Planetary, a chain of globes serving as fields of evolution in theosophical cosmology
 Chain crew, crew that manages signal poles in gridiron football
 Chain gang, group of prisoners chained together as a form of punishment
 Chain letter, a message that attempts to induce the recipient to make a number of copies of the message and then pass them on to one or more new recipients
 Chain of events, a number of actions and their effects that are linked together
 Chain smoking, practice of smoking several cigarettes/cigars in succession
 Chain stitch, in sewing and embroidery, a series of looped stitches that form a chain
 Chaining, a technique from applied behavioral analysis for teaching complicated tasks by breaking them into simpler steps
 Hudson River Chains, one of several chains used in blockades of the Hudson River
 Human chain (politics), a form of protest
 Signifying chain, in semiotics, an interlocking system of signifiers

Measurement
 Chain (unit), a unit of length
 Gunter's chain, a unit of measurement
 New York City Subway chaining, method to specify locations along the New York City Subway lines

Other uses
 Chain (caste), a cultivating and fishing caste found in India
 Chains (nautical), small platforms on the sides of ships
 Fetter (Buddhism) (mental chain), a deeply rooted mental attachment preventing one from achieving liberation from suffering

See also
 CHAIN (disambiguation)
 Chain of Ponds (disambiguation)
 Chain of thought (disambiguation)
 Chained (disambiguation)
 The Chain (disambiguation)
 Daisy chain (disambiguation)
 Serial (disambiguation)
 Chane (disambiguation)